Batangas's 5th congressional district is one of the six congressional districts of the Philippines in the province of Batangas. It has been represented in the House of Representatives of the Philippines since 2016. The district consists of all barangays of the city of Batangas. It is currently represented in the 19th Congress by Mario Vittorio A. Mariño of the Nacionalista Party (NP).

Representation history

Election results

2022

2019

2016 

≥u

See also 
 Legislative districts of Batangas

References 

Congressional districts of the Philippines
Politics of Batangas
2015 establishments in the Philippines
Congressional districts of Calabarzon
Constituencies established in 2015